Ponderosa Steakhouse and Bonanza Steakhouse are a chain of buffet/steakhouse restaurants that are a part of Homestyle Dining LLC based in Plano, Texas. Its menu includes steaks, seafood, and chicken entrées, all of which come with their buffet for a nominal charge. A lunch menu is also served.

Unlike other chains with two names, such as Checkers and Rally's, which uses only one of the names in a given region, restaurants in a given region could be named either Bonanza or Ponderosa.  This is because Bonanza and Ponderosa were separate companies, which were later merged under the Metromedia Restaurant Group.

The names of the restaurants were derived from the TV series Bonanza, which was set at a place called Ponderosa Ranch.

History

In 1963, Dan Blocker, who played Eric "Hoss" Cartwright on Bonanza, started the Bonanza Steakhouse chain.  The first Bonanza opened in Westport, Connecticut. Sam Wyly and his brother Charles Wyly bought the small Bonanza restaurant chain three years later. The company grew to approximately 600 restaurants by 1989, when the Wylys sold it to Metromedia.

In 1965, Dan Lasater, Norm Wiese and Charles Kleptz founded Ponderosa in Kokomo, Indiana, moving the headquarters to Dayton, Ohio, in 1971.

Ponderosa began operating in Canada by 1971 and remained there until 1986, when its focus moved to post-recession US. After closing most Canadian Ponderosa restaurants, the company returned to generating US restaurant franchises in 1986, reversing a previous freeze on new US franchises in the move to Canada. At that time, 36 Canadian Ponderosa locations were acquired by General Mills Restaurant Group which converted them to Red Lobster restaurants. In the meantime, Bonanza maintained a presence in Canada.

In February 1988, Ponderosa was sold to Metromedia Restaurant Group. In September 1989, Metromedia acquired rival Bonanza, combining the two chains. In 1997, Ponderosa and Bonanza united under the Metromedia Family Steakhouses (MFS) organization to be marketed under the Ponderosa or Bonanza brands. MFS was one of founder John Kluge's companies using the Metromedia name.

After its S&A Restaurant Group division was forced into an involuntary Chapter 7 liquidation by its lender, GE Capital, in August 2008, and closed over 300 company-owned Bennigan's and Steak & Ale restaurants, the chain's parent company, Metromedia Steakhouses Company, filed for Chapter 11 bankruptcy in 2008, although it planned to reorganize around franchise operations and a profitable core of company-operated restaurants. It emerged from bankruptcy in 2009 under the name "Homestyle Dining LLC".

The chain engaged Trinity Capital LLC as its financial advisor in 2016 and was sold in late 2017 to FAT Brands, the owner of Fatburger, Buffalo's Cafe and Hurricane Grill & Wings. FAT Brands has approximately 300 locations open, with another 300 under development in 32 countries.

In 1989 there were almost 700 Ponderosa locations. By 2003 there were less than 400 locations. By October 2022 only 17 Ponderosa locations remain open.

See also
 List of buffet restaurants

References

External links
 

Companies based in Kokomo, Indiana
Economy of the Midwestern United States
Economy of the Eastern United States
Regional restaurant chains in the United States
Restaurants established in 1965
Steakhouses in the United States
Buffet restaurants
Restaurant franchises
1965 establishments in Connecticut
Companies that filed for Chapter 11 bankruptcy in 2008
Metromedia
Bonanza